Po Lin Monastery is a Buddhist monastery, located on Ngong Ping Plateau, on Lantau Island, Hong Kong. 

The monastery was founded in 1906 by three monks visiting from Jiangsu Province on the Chinese mainland and was initially known simply as "The Big Hut" ( Tai Mao Pung). It was renamed to its present name in 1924. The main temple houses three bronze statues of the Buddha – representing his past, present and future lives – as well as many Buddhist scriptures. 

Tian Tan Buddha, a giant Buddha statue completed in 1993, is an extension of the monastery.

The Ngong Ping 360, consisting of the Ngong Ping village and a gondola lift running between Tung Chung (東涌) and Ngong Ping (昂坪), was built near to the Po Lin Monastery. The monastery boasts many prominent architectural structures, such as the Main Shrine Hall of Buddha, the Hall of Bodhisattva Skanda.

This monastery is also noted for making wooden bracelets that are only sold near the Tian Tan Buddha statue.

In 1918, three nuns ordained at this monastery established a private nunnery called Chi Chuk Lam on Lantau's Lower Keung Hill. The nunnery is dedicated to Guanyin, the Goddess of Mercy. There were about 20 jushi and nuns residing there in the 1950s, but now only an elderly abbess remains.

See also
Buddhism in Hong Kong 
Buddhist Fat Ho Memorial College
The Big Buddha (Hong Kong)

References

External links
 
Official website 

Buddhist temples in Hong Kong
1906 establishments in Hong Kong
Buddhist monasteries in Hong Kong
Ngong Ping
Religious organizations established in 1906